The 1933 All-Ireland Senior Camogie Championship Final was the 2nd All-Ireland Final and the deciding match of the 1933 All-Ireland Senior Camogie Championship, an inter-county camogie tournament for the top teams in Ireland.

Dublin won their second All-Ireland in a row, captained by Máire Gill.

References

All-Ireland Senior Camogie Championship Final
All-Ireland Senior Camogie Championship Final
All-Ireland Senior Camogie Championship Finals
Dublin county camogie team matches